Jennifer McKenzie may refer to:

Jennifer McKenzie (politician), Canadian politician
Jennifer McKenzie (priest), American Anglican cleric